Switzerland hosts radio stations broadcasting in all its native languages: French, German, Italian, and Rumantsch.

German language 
Schweizer Radio und Fernsehen:
SRF 1
SRF 2 Kultur
SRF 3
SRF 4 News
SRF Musikwelle
SRF Virus
Private:
Radio 24
neo1
neo2
Radio Pilatus
Radio Zürisee
Radio ENERGY Zürich
FM1
Radio Sunshine
Radio Argovia
Community:
Radio 3fach
Radio Blind Power
RadioIndustrie
Radio Kaiseregg
Kanal K
Radio LoRa
Radio RaBe
Radio RaSa
Radio Stadtfilter
toxic.fm
Radio X

French language 
Radio Télévision Suisse:
La 1ère
Espace 2
Couleur 3
Option Musique
Private:
Fréquence Jura
Lausanne FM
One FM
Radio Chablais
Radio Fribourg
Radio Lac
Radio ORBITAL
Rouge FM
RTN
Community:
Cité
Fréquence Banane
Meyrin FM
Spoon Radio
Radio Django
Loose Antenna

Italian language 
Radiotelevisione Svizzera:
Rete Uno
Rete Due
Rete Tre
Private:
Radio3iii
Radio Fiume Ticino
ItaliaOnAir
 Radio Gwendalyn
Radio Morcote International

Rumantsch language 
Radiotelevisiun Svizra Rumantscha
Radio Rumantsch

English language 
World Radio Switzerland
Swissgroove
Swissinfo
Switzerland in Sound

Liechtenstein
Radio Liechtenstein, established as Radio L in 1995, since 2003 operated by the public Liechtensteinischer Rundfunk (LRF) broadcaster.

See also 
 Communications in Switzerland
 Media of Switzerland

External links 
 Radio stations in Switzerland (Radiomap.eu)
 emetteurs.ch, list of FM/DAB transmitters in Switzerland 
 Local Radio list from the Swiss radio regulator 
 Swissradio.net is a directory with the most popular radio stations

Switzerland
Radio stations in Switzerland
 
Radio stations